Jeffrey Alan Ferrell (born November 23, 1990) is an American former professional baseball pitcher who played in Major League Baseball (MLB) for the Detroit Tigers in 2015 and 2017.

Career

Detroit Tigers
Ferrell attended Emsley A. Laney High School in Wilmington, North Carolina, and played collegiately at Pitt Community College. The Detroit Tigers selected Ferrell in the 26th round of the 2010 Major League Baseball draft.

In 2015, Ferrell saved 12 games for the Double-A Erie SeaWolves, while allowing five runs on 21 hits over 27 innings with four walks and 35 strikeouts. He was promoted to the Triple-A Toledo Mud Hens on June 29, earning the save in his debut for the Mud Hens.

Ferrell was called up to the major leagues by the Tigers on July 3, 2015. He made his major league debut on July 4 against the Toronto Blue Jays, pitching one inning, allowing two hits, and two earned runs.

After being released on August 15, 2016, Ferrell resigned a minor league deal with the Tigers on September 1, 2016. On August 13, 2017, the Tigers purchased Ferrell's contract after designating Edward Mujica for assignment. He was outrighted to AAA on November 2, 2017.

Baltimore Orioles
He elected free agency on November 6, 2017. On November 28, Ferrell signed a minor league contract with the Baltimore Orioles. He was released on March 29, 2018.

References

External links

1990 births
Living people
Baseball players from Charlotte, North Carolina
Major League Baseball pitchers
Detroit Tigers players
Connecticut Tigers players
Erie SeaWolves players
Gulf Coast Tigers players
Lakeland Flying Tigers players
Pitt Bulldogs baseball players
Toledo Mud Hens players
West Michigan Whitecaps players
Scottsdale Scorpions players